George Broughton Jr. is an English former professional rugby league footballer who played in the 1940s and 1950s.

Playing career

Challenge cup Final appearances
George Broughton Jr. played , i.e. number 5, in Leeds' 9-7 victory over Barrow in the 1956–57 Challenge Cup Final during the 1956–57 season at Wembley Stadium, London on Saturday 11 May 1957, in front of a crowd of 76,318.

Club career
George Broughton Jr. made his début for Leeds against Warrington at Headingley Rugby Stadium, Leeds on Saturday 6 December 1952. George Broughton Jr. was the Leeds' top try scorer during the 1955–56 season, and scored two tries in Leeds' 10-9 victory over Whitehaven in the 1956–57 Challenge Cup  semi-final during the 1956–57 season at Odsal Stadium, Bradford on Saturday 30 March 1957.

Genealogical information
George Broughton Jr. is the son of the rugby league footballer; George Broughton.

Outside rugby league
Following his retirement from rugby George Broughton Jr. became the landlord of the now demolished Chained Bull public house in Moortown.

References

External links
Search for "Broughton" at rugbyleagueproject.org

Statistics at thecastlefordtigers.co.uk

Living people
Castleford Tigers players
English rugby league players
Leeds Rhinos players
Publicans
Rugby league players from Leeds
Rugby league wingers
Year of birth missing (living people)